Tom Poltl (born September 21, 1977) is a retired American soccer midfielder who was a member of the United States U-20 men's national soccer team at the 1997 FIFA World Youth Championship.

Career

Youth
Poltl attended San Marcos High School, and played college soccer at UCLA from 1995 to 1998. In 1997, Poltl was part of the Bruins team which won the NCAA Men's Soccer Championship over the Virginia Cavaliers.

Professional
In February 1999, the Colorado Rapids selected Poltl in the second round (20th overall) of the MLS College Draft. Soon after, the San Francisco Bay Seals of the USL A-League selected Poltl in the second round (forty-ninth overall) in the A-League draft. The Rapids did not sign him, and the Seals traded his rights to the Boston Bulldogs of the A-League, with whom he spent the 1999 and 2000 seasons. 

In 2002 Poltl signed as a player-coach with the Orange County Blue Star of the fourth division USL Premier Development League. On April 20, 2005, he moved to the Portland Timbers of the USL First Division. He played over 100 games for Portland in his five years with club, leading his team to the 2009 USL First Division championship, before being released on December 7, 2009.

International
Between 1995 and 1997, Poltl earned eleven caps with the U.S. U-20 national team. In 1997, he was a member of the U.S. team at the 1997 FIFA World Youth Championship. He played one game, a 3-0 loss to Uruguay in the Round of 16.

References

External links
 Portland Timbers bio
 UCLA Bruins stats

1977 births
American soccer coaches
American soccer players
Boston Bulldogs (soccer) players
Cape Cod Crusaders players
Colorado Rapids draft picks
Association football midfielders
Living people
Orange County Blue Star players
People from San Marcos, California
Portland Timbers (2001–2010) players
Soccer players from California
UCLA Bruins men's soccer players
A-League (1995–2004) players
USL Second Division players
USL First Division players
USL League Two players
United States men's under-20 international soccer players